The Death of Alfred is an Old English poem that is part of the Anglo-Saxon Chronicle, concerning the killing of Alfred Aetheling in 1036. It is noted for its departure from traditional Old English poetic metre, abandoning the alliterative verse form in favour of fairly consistently rhyming hemistichs.

Context 
The poem occurs as part of the entry for 1036 in manuscripts C and D of the Chronicle, which begins in prose:
Her com Ælfred, se unsceððiga æþeling, Æþelrædes sunu cinges, hider inn and wolde to his meder, þe on Wincestre sæt, ac hit him ne geþafode Godwine eorl, ne ec oþre men þe mycel mihton wealdan, forðan hit hleoðrode þa swiðe toward Haraldes, þeh hit unriht wære.

In this year, Ælfred, the innocent prince, son of King Æthelræd, came here, and desired to travel to his mother, who was in residence in Winchester. But neither Earl Godwin nor other people wielding great power allowed him, because things spoke much more towards Harald, although it was unjust.

Text, translation, and scansion

Recordings 

 Michael D. C. Drout, 'Death of Alfred', performed from the Anglo-Saxon Poetic Records edition (12 December 2007).

Digital Facsimile Editions 
 Foys, Martin and Carsten Haas, Old English Poetry in Facsimile Project, 2019; DOI: 10.21231/t6a2-jt11

References 

Old English poetry
English chronicles